Titán or TITAN is a Mexican electronic band formed in 1992 from the industrial band Melamina Ponderosa, where Emilio Acevedo and Julián Lede first met each other, later Jay de la Cueva (Molotov, Microchips, Fobia, Moderatto) joined the band. They have released four albums, the most recent, Dama in 2016.

Career 
The band was formed in 1992 after two members from the industrial band Melamina Ponderosa, Emilio Acevedo and Julián Lede split and recruited Andrés Sánchez.  Later Jay de la Cueva (Molotov, Microchips, Fobia, Moderatto) joined the band.

In 1995, the trio made their debut with the Terrodisco EP. It was followed by the single "C'mon Feel the Noise". They moved to Virgin Records for the album Elevator that was produced by Michael Franti, Craig Borrell and Ross Harris. If featured the singles "1,2,3,4" and "Corazón", whose videos were directed by Evan Bernard.

In 2005, they released their self-titled album Titán through the new Mexican indie label Nuevos Ricos.

The band released their fourth album Dama on 28 August 2016 through ATP Recordings, which was produced by English producer Nick Launay. It features vocals by Gary Numan, Siobhan Fahey, Egyptian Lover, Church and El Columpio Asesino.

Band members
Jay de la Cueva - Bass
Emilio Acevedo - Keyboard
Julián Lede - Guitar

Past members
Andrés Sánchez - Bass, fue remplazado en 1997 por Jay de la Cueva

Discography
 1995 - Terrodisco
 1999 - Corazón EP
 1999 - Elevator 
 2005 - Titán 
 2016 - Dama

Terrodisco

Tracks
 Cuin
 Alto Impacto
 La Chica de ULA ULA
 Jaguar 83
 CUIN (RADIO MIX)
 ULA ULA (RADIO MIX)
 SAFARI MIX
 KARATE MIX
 Bonus Track

Elevator

Tracks
 1, 2, 3, 4
 Corazón
 Honey
 Battle Love
 The Future
 King Kong
 C'mon Feel the Noise
 La Frecuencia del Amor
 1000 Ninjas
 Vaquero
 Sawrite
 P.E.C.

 
The song "1,2,3,4" was included in the album for the Mexican movie "Todo el poder".

Then, the next album they released, self-titled included these songs:

Titán

Tracks
 Space Chemo
 Pasion y Amor
 Odisea 2001
 Placa Acero
 Chemix
 Araña
 Mi Chica
 Back in Jail
 Bonanza Edomex
 Estampida

Dama Fina 

In 2016, Titan returns after almost ten years of absence. This new production was recorded in the studios of Sonic Ranch, Texas, United States. The sound of the album is characterized by its dark atmosphere and for having important collaborations such as the participation of Siobhan Fahey, El Columpio Asesino, Church, Egyptian Lover y uno de los precursores del synth-pop, la leyenda Gary Numan.

Tracks
 Dama Fina
 Hella.A. (Feat. Siobha Fahey)
 Tchaikovsky
 Sangre
 Dama Negra (Feat. El Columpio Asesino)
 Dark Rain (Feat. Gary Numan)
 El Rey del Swing
 Apache
 Arahant (Feat. Church)
 Soldado
 She Likes De Music (Feat. Egyptian Lover)
 Himno

References

External links
Titan  at AllMusic
Titan  on Discogs
Titan  on Facebook

Mexican electronic musical groups
ATP Recordings artists
Virgin Records artists